Operation Puttur was an anti-terror operation launched jointly by the Tamil Nadu Police and the Andhra Pradesh Police, which captured two terror suspects in Puttur on 5 October 2013. Part of the banned Al Ummah outfit, they were planning to plant bombs at the famed Tirumala Venkateswara Temple, the most visited temple in India. The suspects also had a plan to murder a famous person in Chennai in the name of the "Muslim Defence Force."  The operation reportedly ended those conspiracies.

Background

Al Ummah is a terrorist group involved in many terrorist attacks in Tamil Nadu. Started in 1993 after the Babri Masjid demolition, the organization was noticed for the 1993 bombing of RSS office in Chennai, which killed eleven people. The organization is tied to other attacks like the Coimbatore serial bomb blasts which killed 58 persons, while targeting Bharatiya Janata Party leader L. K. Advani during the city's election campaign.  It was tied to the bomb blast in Bangalore, the state capital of Karnataka. The terrorists were planning to strike the Tirumala Venkateswara Temple using umbrella bombs amidst the many pilgrims during the annual Brahmostavam festival. The Tamil Nadu police arrested one of the militants named Fakruddin (also called 'Police Fakrudin') on 4 October 2013. Police Fakrudin, Panna Ismail and Bilal Malik were suspects in plotting attacks on Bharathiya Janata Party leader L.K. Advani during October 2011, murder of BJP's Arvinth Reddy, Auditor Ramesh, Murugan and Hindu Munnani leader Vellaiyappan.

Arvinth Reddy
On October 23, 2012, Doctor Arvinth Reddy, the then state medical wing secretary of Bharatiya Janata Party was killed in front of his clinic in Kosapet area of Vellore, Tamil Nadu. According to the police, then 38-year old Arvinth Reddy was stabbed at the back of his neck using knife by a three-member gang and he died on the spot. Six accused were nabbed on November 21 and 22, 2013  and one of them, Vasur Raja, accepted their role in the murder of doctor. However, in December 2013, a Special Investigation Division of the CBCID pointed their suspicion towards Fakruddin and his associates Panna Ismail and Bilal Malik. Fakruddin confessed that he and his two associates were involved in the murder of Arvinth Reddy.

Murugan
On March 19, 2013, Murugan.K aged 45, former BJP municipal councillor, was hacked to death by a three-member gang in Paramakudi main bazaar while he was returning home for lunch The gang also hurled pipe bombs at the murdered person and two live pipe bombs were recovered from the scene and defused. This murder happened in front of shopkeepers and public, who fled the spot in panic.
Initially, four suspects were arrested, but later upon the confession of Fakruddin, they were released after four months of imprisonment.

Vellaiyappan
On July 1, 2013, Vellaiyappan, aged 45, Tamil Nadu state secretary of Hindu Munnani was in his two-wheeler in Vellore going to Ramakrishna Mutt when he was attacked on his head from behind. He was then hacked in his neck and the assailants escaped. Volunteers belonging to Hindu Munnani then agitated demanding action against assailants. It was revealed during the interrogation of Fakruddin that he had met Vellaiyappan a day before the murder and had a conversation posing as a Hindu

Auditor Ramesh
On July 19, 2013, "Auditor" V.Ramesh aged 54, was hacked to death inside the compound of his house by an unknown gang in Salem. Jayalalitha, then Chief Minister of Tamil Nadu constituted a Special Investigation Division to probe the murder of "Auditor" Ramesh.

Fakrudin evaded arrest for 8 years and along with Panna Ismail and Bilal Malik in a group called "Muslim Defence Force" were planning to kill a public figure in Tamil Nadu in 2013. The Tamil Nadu Police became aware of his movements. He landed in Chennai Central station on 4 October 2013, when two policemen in plain clothes followed, chased and captured him.

Operation

On 5 October 2013, two terror suspects were holed up in a house in Puttur.  Bilal Malik and Panna Ismail were in the house; while their accomplice, Fakrudin (also called Police Fakrudin) was captured a day before in Chennai. The three were part of the banned Al Ummah outfit. They were planning to plant bombs in the famed Tirumala Venkateswara Temple, the most visited temple in India. and also had a plan to murder a famous person in Chennai in the name of Muslim Defence Force. They were earlier suspected to be involved in several other cases like the murder plot of L.K. Advani and bombing in Malleswaram in Bangalore where 16 people were injured.

The operation was started at 4 in the morning and continued for 10 hours. One of the police constables sustained injuries in the operation and eventually died in hospital; of the four terrorists who were holed up, two  namely Malik and Ismailn  were captured. Malik's wife and three children were used by the two as human shields and the operation continued for 10 hours. The suspects came out of the house after a prolonged exchange of fire.

They were coaxed and finally overcome by the dropping of percussion shells and tear gas from the top of the house. The operation was the first of its kind for Octopus, a newly formed anti-terror unit of the Andhra Police. The searches by the police yielded two bombs and a pistol used by the suspects. A police inspector named Lakshmanan who went incognito as a commoner was attacked by the militants and he sustained injuries. Mutual fire was exchanged for a while.

Later in the day, the Octopus team members joined the operation. They cordoned off the area from common people and fired tear gas into the house. The two militants who rushed out were nabbed by the team.  Mr. Panna Ismail sustained bullet injuries in the arrest. Two other suspects who were holed up escaped. It was later found out that the lady was the wife of Malik who preferred to stay with her and his children. The lady and the children were detained by Tamil Nadu police, which briefly created a furor. A twelve-member police team from Tamil Nadu visited the place few weeks after the operation along with Malik to hold enquiries about the duo. While most of the civilians were reluctant to reveal information, repeated queries and assurance of the police revealed that the duo were involved in selling vegetables less than the market price and were popular in the area.

Crew
Operation Puttur was a joint operation of the Tamil Nadu state police and the Andhra Pradesh State police. The operation was the first of its kind for OCTOPUS (Organisation for Counter Terrorist Operations), a newly formed anti-terror unit of the Andhra Police constituted specifically for handling terrorism related issues. K. Srinivas, one of the civilians aged 25, was also in the team aiding the police. He was one of the three to climb up the roof of the house and issued warnings and persuasive statements to the suspects. He aided the police to drop stun grenades and tear gas from the roof into the houses.

References

2010s in Tamil Nadu
2013 in India
Crime in Tamil Nadu
Law enforcement operations in India
Tamil Nadu Police
Andhra Pradesh Police
Law enforcement in Tamil Nadu